The Jerome C. Hunsaker Visiting Professor of Aerospace Systems is a professorship established in 1954 by the Massachusetts Institute of Technology (MIT) Department of Aeronautics and Astronautics. It is named after MIT professor Jerome Hunsaker (1886–1984) in honor of his achievements in aeronautical engineering. The visiting professor is expected to deliver the Minta Martin Lecture in several venues in the United States.

Visiting professors

References

1954 establishments in Massachusetts
Massachusetts Institute of Technology
Aerospace Systems, Hunsaker, Jerome C.